Tarra Denelle Simmons (born 1977) is an American politician, lawyer, and civil rights activist for criminal justice reform.

In 2011 Simmons was sentenced to 30 months in prison for theft and drug crimes. In 2017, she graduated from Seattle University School of Law with honors. After law school, she was not allowed to sit for the Washington State bar exam due to her status as a former convicted felon, thus she challenged the Washington State Bar Association rules in the Washington State Supreme Court and won with the court unanimously ruling in her favor. She was later sworn in as an attorney in the State of Washington on June 16, 2018.

Simmons is the executive director for a nonprofit focused on assisting those that are formerly incarcerated, known as the Civil Survival Project. She and her husband Eric are the parents of three children.

In 2020, Simmons was elected to the Washington House of Representatives for District 23-Position 1. Her victory is assumed to be the first legislative race to be won by a felon in the state of Washington. Currently, Simmons serves on the committees for Civil Rights and Judiciary, Health Care and Wellness, Public Safety, and Rules. She also serves as the Vice Chair for the Civil Rights and Judiciary Committee.

References 

Criminal justice reform in the United States
Washington (state) lawyers
Democratic Party members of the Washington House of Representatives
Seattle University School of Law alumni
Living people
1977 births